Tirsa is a genus of moths of the family Crambidae, containing only one species Tirsa fiona. It is found in French Polynesia (Rapa Iti).

The wingspan is 24–28 mm. It is a dark brown moth with dark camouflaging speckles throughout its body. It is also known for its long, narrow antennae, which often extend back over its head, rather than ahead.

References

Natural History Museum Lepidoptera genus database

Pyraustinae
Crambidae genera